Aimee Sandimés Garcia López de Ordóñez is an American actress and writer.  She is known for her television roles as Veronica Palmero on the ABC sitcom George Lopez, Yvonne Sanchez on the CBS period drama Vegas, Jamie Batista on the Showtime drama Dexter and Ella Lopez on the Fox/Netflix drama Lucifer.

Early life
Aimee Garcia was born in Chicago, Illinois. Her mother, Eloisa, is from Pachuca, Hidalgo, Mexico, and graduated from Northwestern University's dental school; her father, Hector, is from San Juan, Puerto Rico, and was in the U.S. Armed Forces. Garcia started acting in commercials as a child, and participated in theater at seven years old. She grew up in Oak Park, Illinois, where she attended Fenwick High School. While in school, she took acting classes at Piven Theatre Workshop. She appeared in local plays and musicals during her time at Northwestern University, where she triple majored in economics, journalism, and French. After graduating, she quit acting for a year and did finance work for a mutual fund analyst in Brooklyn, New York. Unsatisfied with the job, she moved to Los Angeles, California, around 2002 to pursue acting as her career.

Career
She portrayed Maria on The WB's Greetings from Tucson, and appeared in the unaired pilot episode of Global Frequency.  She had a role in the Disney Channel original movie Cadet Kelly (2002), and co-starred, as Lydia, alongside Anthony Anderson in The WB sitcom All About the Andersons. In 2006, she began appearing on the series George Lopez, playing Lopez's niece.

Garcia starred alongside Jessica Simpson in the comedy-drama Major Movie Star (2008). She also played a supporting role in the movie D-War (2007) and narrated the Adam Sandler film Spanglish (2004).

From 2009 to 2010, she was in the cast of the Peter Berg NBC medical drama Trauma, as EMT helicopter pilot Marisa Benez.

Garcia spent three years on Showtime's Dexter as Jamie Batista, for which she was nominated for a SAG Award for Best Ensemble in Dramatic Television Series.

She played Dr. Jae Kim in MGM's reboot film, RoboCop (2014).

In 2016, Garcia was added to the main cast for the second season of the Fox television series Lucifer, playing LAPD forensic scientist Ella Lopez. In 2019, Garcia starred in the independent film El Chicano, receiving praise from The Hollywood Reporter for her performance's "vivid impression".

In 2019, Garcia formed a writing partnership with former professional wrestler AJ Mendez. Their first project was the comic book series GLOW vs. The Babyface, based on the television series GLOW; the first of four issues was published by IDW Publishing in November 2019. In 2020, they created the production company Scrappy Heart Productions, dedicated to elevating diverse voices through storytelling. They went on to co-write the Dungeons & Dragons four-issue limited series At the Spine of the World; the first issue was published by IDW in November 2020. Alongside John Swetman, they co-wrote the screenplay for the 2022 Netflix film Blade of the 47 Ronin.

Personal life 
Garcia resides in Los Angeles, California.

On May 4, 2021, the Chicago Red Stars of the National Women's Soccer League announced that Garcia had joined the women's soccer team's ownership group.

Filmography

Film

Television

Bibliography 
 GLOW vs. The Babyface, with AJ Mendez, illustrated by Hannah Templer (IDW Publishing, June 2020)
 Dungeons & Dragons: At the Spine of the World, with AJ Mendez, illustrated by Martin Coccolo and Katrina Mae Hao (IDW Publishing, July 2021)

Accolades

References

External links

 

1978 births
20th-century American actresses
21st-century American actresses
Actresses from Chicago
American actresses of Mexican descent
American actresses of Puerto Rican descent
American film actresses
American television actresses
American voice actresses
Hispanic and Latino American actresses
Living people
Northwestern University alumni
Chicago Red Stars owners